Gary McBride (15 March 1980 – 18 December 2009) was a professional rugby league footballer who played for the St. George Illawarra Dragons. A former Fragons junior from Hurstville United and an Under 17 rep player, Gary McBride featured in one first grade season in 2002.

He died on 18 December 2009.

References

Australian rugby league players
St. George Illawarra Dragons players
1980 births
2009 deaths
Rugby league second-rows
Rugby league players from Sydney